Medial border may refer to:
 Medial border of scapula
 Medial border of kidney, the side of the kidney where the renal hilum is located